Soumbeïla Diakité (born 25 August 1984) is a Malian former professional footballer who played as a goalkeeper.

International career
Diakité was part of the Mali U-20 team which finished third in group stage of 2003 FIFA World Youth Championship. He was part of the Malian 2004 Olympic team which exited in the quarter finals, finishing top of group A, but losing to Italy in the next round.

Career statistics

References

External links

 

1984 births
Living people
Sportspeople from Bamako
Association football goalkeepers
Malian footballers
Mali international footballers
Mali under-20 international footballers
Olympic footballers of Mali
Footballers at the 2004 Summer Olympics
2008 Africa Cup of Nations players
2010 Africa Cup of Nations players
2012 Africa Cup of Nations players
2011 African Nations Championship players
2013 Africa Cup of Nations players
2015 Africa Cup of Nations players
2017 Africa Cup of Nations players
Stade Malien players
Esteghlal Khuzestan players
Malian expatriate footballers
Expatriate footballers in Iran
21st-century Malian people
Mali A' international footballers
Malian expatriate sportspeople in Iran